The Union of Working People's Forces – UWPF ( | Ittihâd qiwâ al-'amal al-cha'b al-'âmil), also known as Union of Toiling Peoples' Forces (UTPF) or Union des Forces du Peuple Travailleur (UFPT) in French, was a Nasserist political party in Lebanon which played a key role in the Lebanese Civil War (1975-1990).

Origins
The party was founded in 1965 by Kamal Chatila and Najah Wakim, with Chatila being its general secretary. In ideological terms, the UNWPF represented a right-wing tendency in the Lebanese Nasserist movement.

Najah Wakim was elected to parliament in 1972, making him the sole Nasserist deputy.

The UWPF in the Lebanese Civil War
In the early phase of the Lebanese Civil War the UWPF maintained a 1,000-man strong militia, the Victory Divisions (Arabic:  Firqat an-Nasr), which fought alongside the Lebanese National Movement (LNM) militias in the Beirut area, and also maintained military training bases in Nabatieh, Kfar Remen and Habboûch, and received significant support from both the Shia and Sunni Muslim communities. However, in late March 1976 the UWPF left the LNM to enter the pro-Syrian Front of Patriotic and National Parties (FPNP) alliance, and supported the June 1976 Syrian intervention in Lebanon, which caused a rift between them and the other Nasserist groups. From June to November 1976 the UWPF and its militia faced onslaughts by Fatah and the other LNM militias.

There was also a splinter group of the party, the Union of Working People's Forces-Corrective Movement (UWPF-CM), formed in October 1974 and led by Issam Al-Arab.

See also
Al-Mourabitoun
Battle of the Hotels
Front of Patriotic and National Parties
Lebanese Civil War
Lebanese Front
Lebanese National Movement
List of weapons of the Lebanese Civil War
People's Movement (Lebanon)

References

Bibliography

 Alain Menargues, Les Secrets de la guerre du Liban: Du coup d'état de Béchir Gémayel aux massacres des camps palestiniens, Albin Michel, Paris 2004.  (in French)
Edgar O'Ballance, Civil War in Lebanon, 1975-92, Palgrave Macmillan, London 1998. 
 Itamar Rabinovich, The war for Lebanon, 1970-1985, Cornell University Press, Ithaca and London 1989 (revised edition). , 0-8014-9313-7 – 
 Marius Deeb, The Lebanese Civil War, Praeger Publishers Inc., New York 1980. 
 Thomas Collelo (ed.), Lebanon: a country study, Library of Congress, Federal Research Division, Headquarters, Department of the Army (DA Pam 550-24), Washington D.C., December 1987 (Third edition 1989). – 

1965 establishments in Lebanon
Arab nationalism in Lebanon
Arab nationalist militant groups
Defunct nationalist parties
Defunct political parties in Lebanon
Defunct socialist parties in Asia
Factions in the Lebanese Civil War
Nasserist political parties
Nationalist parties in Lebanon
Political parties established in 1965
Political parties with year of disestablishment missing
Socialist parties in Lebanon